Mariia Hanhur (born ) is a Ukrainian weightlifter, and European Champion. She won the gold medal in the 2022 European Weightlifting Championships in the 64 kg event.

She won the gold medal in her event at the 2022 European Junior & U23 Weightlifting Championships held in Durrës, Albania.

References

Living people
2000 births
Ukrainian female weightlifters
European Weightlifting Championships medalists
21st-century Ukrainian women